Sobieszów (short:) is a part of the town of Jelenia Góra in Poland.

It is located near Karkonosze National Park. The ruined castle Chojnik is located in Sobieszów.

Jelenia Góra
Neighbourhoods in Poland